George H. Bon Salle (July 1, 1935 – July 20, 2015) was an American professional basketball player.  A  forward, he starred at Loyola Academy in Chicago, Illinois, before playing at the University of Illinois.  As a senior in 1957, Bon Salle was awarded All-American honors, and he was selected by the NBA's Syracuse Nationals in that year's professional draft.  However, Bon Salle never played for the Nationals. He spent part of his professional career with the National Industrial Basketball League's Denver Truckers.  A gold-medalist at the 1959 Pan-American Games, Bon Salle also played briefly for the NBA's Chicago Packers (now the Washington Wizards) during the 1961–62 season.

He collected the posters of the French graphic artist Bernard Villemot and published a catalogue raisonné of those works.

References

External links
 
 Profile at Loyola Academy Hall of Fame

1935 births
2015 deaths
All-American college men's basketball players
American expatriate basketball people in Italy
American men's basketball players
Basketball players at the 1959 Pan American Games
Basketball players from Chicago
Chicago Packers players
Illinois Fighting Illini men's basketball players
Olimpia Milano players
Pan American Games gold medalists for the United States
Pan American Games medalists in basketball
Power forwards (basketball)
Syracuse Nationals draft picks
Medalists at the 1959 Pan American Games